Saint-Amand (Auvergnat: Sent Amand) is a commune in the Creuse department of the region Nouvelle-Aquitaine in central France.

Politics and administration

List of mayors

Population and demographics

Local culture and heritage

Historic locations and monuments 

 The Château de Fot in neo-gothic style.
 Saint-Amand church with its bell-gable.

See also
Communes of the Creuse department

References

Communes of Creuse